Caloptilia aurita is a moth of the family Gracillariidae. It is known from Natal in South Africa.

References

Endemic moths of South Africa
aurita
Moths of Africa
Moths described in 1989